Melvin Henry Taube (December 20, 1904 – June 15, 1979) was an American football, basketball, and baseball player, coach, and college athletics administrator.  He served as the head football coach at Massachusetts State College, from 1931 to 1935 and at Carleton College from 1960 to 1969, compiling a career college football record of 62–58–5.  Taube was also the head basketball coach at Massachusetts State College (1933–1936), Purdue University (1945–1950), and Carleton (1950–1960), amassing a career college basketball mark of 201–142 and winning four Midwest Conference championships.    He was the head baseball coach at Massachusetts State (1932–1935), Purdue (1947–1950), and Carleton (1951–1970), tallying a career college baseball record of 93–74–3.  A three-sport letterman, Taube played football, basketball, and baseball at Purdue.

Coaching career
Taube spent 20 seasons at Carleton College, arriving in the summer of 1950 as the head basketball and head baseball coach.  He was also an assistant football coach until assuming the role of head football coach in 1960, following the death of Warren Beson. Taube served as Carleton's head football coach, head baseball coach, and athletic director until his retirement in 1970.

In his honor, Carleton annually awards the Mel Taube Award to a varsity athlete for "dedication, loyalty, competitive spirit, and excellence in athletics."  In 2008, the Carleton baseball field was named for Taube.

Head coaching record

Football

Basketball

Baseball

References

External links
 Mel Taube at College Basketball at Sports-Reference.com

1904 births
1979 deaths
American football quarterbacks
American men's basketball players
United States Navy personnel of World War II
Basketball coaches from Michigan
Basketball players from Detroit
Carleton Knights athletic directors
Carleton Knights baseball coaches
Carleton Knights football coaches
Carleton Knights men's basketball coaches
Indiana University alumni
Purdue Boilermakers baseball coaches
Purdue Boilermakers baseball players
Purdue Boilermakers football coaches
Purdue Boilermakers football players
Purdue Boilermakers men's basketball coaches
Purdue Boilermakers men's basketball players
Players of American football from Detroit
Sportspeople from Detroit
UMass Minutemen baseball coaches
UMass Minutemen basketball coaches
UMass Minutemen football coaches
United States Navy officers